The Praha is a EuroCity international express train.  Introduced in 1993, it runs between Warsaw, the capital of Poland, and Prague, the capital of the Czech Republic.  The train's name, Praha, is the Czech word for Prague.

, the southbound train departs at shortly after 09:00 and the northbound train at shortly after 10:00.  Both trains arrive at their destinations after a journey time of approximately eight and a half hours.

See also

 History of rail transport in the Czech Republic
 History of rail transport in Poland
 List of EuroCity services
 List of named passenger trains of Europe

References

EuroCity
International named passenger trains
Named passenger trains of the Czech Republic
Named passenger trains of Poland
Railway services introduced in 1993